Fever, in comics may refer to:
 Fever (DC Comics), a DC Comics character
 Fever, an Image Comics character who appeared in Freak Force
 Fever, a Marvel Comics character who appeared in Doom 2099

See also
 Fever (disambiguation)
 Fever Pitch (comics), a Marvel Comics supervillain

References